George Mambosasa (born 31 January 1964) is a Malawian former long-distance runner.

George competed in both the 5000 metres and the marathon at the 1984 Summer Olympics in Los Angeles. He finished twelfth in heat one of the 5000 metres and so failed to qualify for the next round, and he completed the marathon in 74th place. At the 1988 Summer Olympics in Seoul, he took part in the marathon but did not finish. Mambosasa was the Malawian flag carrier in the opening ceremony at these games.

In the men's 5000 metres event at the 1986 Commonwealth Games in Glasgow, Mambosasa set the current Malawian national record for the men's 3000 metres with a time of 8:25.3.

References

1964 births
Living people
Malawian male long-distance runners
Olympic athletes of Malawi
Athletes (track and field) at the 1984 Summer Olympics
Athletes (track and field) at the 1988 Summer Olympics
Commonwealth Games competitors for Malawi
Athletes (track and field) at the 1986 Commonwealth Games
Athletes (track and field) at the 1990 Commonwealth Games